Syleena Johnson ( Thompson; September 2, 1976) is an American singer-songwriter, actress and television presenter from Chicago, Illinois.

Personal life
Johnson is the daughter of 1960s R&B Hi Records singer Syl Johnson and Brenda Thompson, who was the first black female police commissioner of Harvey, Illinois. Syleena has two older sisters; Syleecia and Sylette. In August 2000, Johnson married former Illinois State University college basketball player Marcus Betts. Betts graduated in December 2000 and became her manager for her first two albums. 

On July 1, 2007, she married Kiwane Garris. Garris, a fellow Chicagoan, is a worldwide journeyman basketball player, having played for various NBA and EuroLeague teams. On August 1, 2007, after forty-eight hours of labor, their son Kiwane Garris Jr. was born. On February 6, 2011, she gave birth to their second son Kingston.

Johnson is a member of Zeta Phi Beta sorority.

Music career

Chapter 2: The Voice was voted No. 62 in a list of the best Soul Albums of the 2000s on Soultracks.com. Mojo, in its February 2003 issue, gave "Chapter 2: The Voice" a glowing review – "...A coherent and engaging R&B album that explores love's vicissitudes with a confessional candour...Classy..."

In 2004, Johnson was featured as a vocalist on Kanye West's single "All Falls Down", from his debut album The College Dropout.

2005–2008: Chapter 3: The Flesh 
In 2005, Johnson released Chapter 3: The Flesh. Contact Music gave the album a 5/5 review, stating: "Third album for Jive from probably the most under-rated artist in the world is just what you expect from an artist of this quality... Quite simply for sheer quality this is one of the albums of the year."

2008–2009: I Am Your Woman: The Best of Syleena Johnson and Chapter 4: Labor Pains 
Chapter 4: Labor Pains was released on January 13, 2009.

In 2009, Johnson appeared on a single with KRS-One, Twista and Crucial Conflict titled "Self Destruction". According to Grant Parks and Coalmine Music, artists lent their lyrics for a cause they believe in with the statement "The time is now as we approach the holidays and a new year; it will give us all something to think about and reflect on loved ones that lost their life to senseless violent acts."

Steve Jones of USA Today gave Chapter 4: Labor Pains 3.5/4 stating "Despite critical acclaim for her ongoing personal chronicles that began with 2001's Chapter 1: Love, Pain & Forgiveness, the soulful Chicago native never found a mainstream niche. Unfairly, she's best known for Kanye West's All Falls Down. Here, with her gorgeous voice and evocative storytelling, she continues to offer some of the decade's most stirring R&B."

2012–2014: R&B Divas: Atlanta, 9ine and Chapter 6: Couples Therapy 
Johnson starred in TV One reality series R&B Divas: Atlanta from 2012 to 2014; lasting three seasons. She is currently managed by DYG Management. On September 23, 2013, Johnson and Musiq Soulchild released a duet album titled 9ine.

2015–present: Graduation, Rebirth of Soul and Woman 

In June 2015, Johnson graduated from Drake University, where she received her bachelor's degree in nutrition science, summa cum laude, 21 years after she enrolled. She was also inducted into the Alpha Beta Kappa honors society for her academic achievements.

Johnson was featured on "Donda Chant", the opening track to Kanye West's tenth album Donda, released in August 2021.

Discography 

Love Hangover (1998)
Chapter 1: Love, Pain & Forgiveness (2001)
Chapter 2: The Voice (2002)
Chapter 3: The Flesh (2005)
Chapter 4: Labor Pains (2009)
Chapter 5: Underrated (2011)
Chapter 6: Couples Therapy (2014)
Rebirth of Soul (2017)
 Woman (2020)

Awards and nominations

References

External links
Syleena Johnson official website
DYG Management official website

 
 

African-American actresses
African-American women singer-songwriters
American rhythm and blues singer-songwriters
American film actresses
American women hip hop singers
Drake University alumni
Illinois State University alumni
Living people
American neo soul singers
People from Harvey, Illinois
Singers from Chicago
American contemporary R&B singers
Ballad musicians
African-American television talk show hosts
American television talk show hosts
1976 births
21st-century African-American women singers
Singer-songwriters from Illinois
21st-century American women singers
21st-century American singers